Wisconsin's 11th congressional district is a former congressional district of the United States House of Representatives in Wisconsin.  It was created following the 1900 Census, and was disbanded after the 1930 Census. The district covered the far northern part of the state during its time of existence. All Representatives who were ever elected to the seat were members of the Republican Party.

List of members representing the district

References

 Congressional Biographical Directory of the United States 1774–present

Former congressional districts of the United States
11
1903 establishments in Wisconsin
1933 disestablishments in Wisconsin